The  is a public museum in Tokyo, Japan. It is the history museum for the development of the freshwater supply and distribution in Tokyo. The museum was opened on 15 April 1995. The museum consists of two exhibition floors and a library on the third floor. It is located in Hongō next to the Hongō Water Supply Station Park. Admission is free.

Exhibition
The museum has two exhibition floors. The second floor gives an overview of the construction of canals to supply the city with fresh water in the Edo period. Several old wood water pipes are on display. The first floor shows the modernization of the water system in the Meiji period and 20th century. The exhibition is in Japanese, but audio guides are available in English free of charge.

References

External links
Official website
Information page at the Tokyo Metropolitan Government Bureau of Waterworks

Water supply and sanitation in Japan
Museums in Tokyo
History museums in Japan
Museums established in 1995
1995 establishments in Japan
Industry museums in Japan
Buildings and structures in Bunkyō